Sarankhola is an upazila of Bagerhat District in the Division of Khulna, Bangladesh.

Geography
It has 19,588 households and total area 756.61 km2.

Demographics
As of the 1991 Bangladesh census, Sarankhola has a population of 107,856. Males constitute 51.28% of the population, and females 48.72%. This Upazila's eighteen up population is 52,157. Sarankhola has an average literacy rate of 41.8% (7+ years), and the national average of 32.4% literate.

Administration
Sarankhola Upazila is divided into four union parishads: Dakshinkhali, Dhanshagor, Khontakata, and Rayenda. The union parishads are subdivided into 11 mauzas and 44 villages.

See also
Upazilas of Bangladesh
Districts of Bangladesh
Divisions of Bangladesh

References

Upazilas of Bagerhat District
Bagerhat District
Khulna Division